Bovard Field was a stadium in Los Angeles, California, on the campus of the University of Southern California. The football stadium and running track held 12,000 people at its peak, and ran southwest to northeast, near and parallel to today's Watt Way.

The baseball field was aligned (home to center field) similar to Dedeaux Field, but a few degrees clockwise, nearly true north, but just slightly west. Home plate was located in today's E.F. Hutton Park and left field was bounded by Watt Way. Beyond first base, a large eucalyptus tree came into play; while its trunk was in foul territory, some of its branches crossed into fair territory and guarded the foul line in shallow right field.

Mickey Mantle
In March 1951, a 19-year-old Mickey Mantle of the New York Yankees, about to embark on his rookie season in the majors, went 4-for-5 with a pair of home runs, one from each side of the plate against the Trojans in an exhibition game. The home run as a leftie was a massive shot that went well beyond the right field fence into the football practice field, during spring drills. He also had a triple for a total of seven runs batted in for the game, which the Yanks won 15–1.

References

External links
 Stadium information

American football venues in Los Angeles
Athletics (track and field) venues in Los Angeles
Baseball venues in Los Angeles
Defunct athletics (track and field) venues in the United States
Defunct college football venues
Defunct college baseball venues in the United States
USC Trojans baseball venues
USC Trojans football venues
1973 disestablishments in California
Sports venues demolished in 1973